Latvia participated in the Eurovision Song Contest 2006 with the song "I Hear Your Heart" written by Andris Sējāns, Reinis Sējāns, Guntars Račs and Molly-Ann Leikin. The song was performed by the group Cosmos. The Latvian broadcaster Latvijas Televīzija (LTV) organised the national final Eirodziesma 2006 in order to select the Latvian entry for the 2006 contest in Athens, Greece. Twenty songs were selected to compete in the national final, which consisted of three shows: two semi-finals and a final. In the semi-finals on 4 and 11 February 2006, five entries were selected to advance from each show: three entries selected based on a public televote and two entries selected by a five-member jury panel. Ten songs ultimately qualified to compete in the final on 11 March 2006 where two rounds of public voting selected "I Hear Your Heart" performed by Cosmos as the winner.

As one of the ten highest placed finishers in 2005, Latvia automatically qualified to compete in the final of the Eurovision Song Contest. Performing during the show in position 4, Latvia placed sixteenth out of the 24 participating countries with 30 points.

Background 

Prior to the 2007 contest, Latvia had participated in the Eurovision Song Contest seven times since its first entry in 2000. Latvia won the contest once in 2002 with the song "I Wanna" performed by Marie N. Following the introduction of semi-finals for the 2004, Latvia was able to qualify to compete in the final in 2005 with the entry "The War Is Not Over" performed by Walters and Kazha. The Latvian national broadcaster, Latvijas Televīzija (LTV), broadcasts the event within Latvia and organises the selection process for the nation's entry. Latvia has selected their entries for the Eurovision Song Contest through a national final. Since their debut in 2000, LTV had organised the selection show Eirodziesma. The broadcaster organised Eirodziesma 2006 in order to select the Latvian entry for the 2006 contest.

Before Eurovision

Eirodziesma 2006 
Eirodziesma 2006 was the seventh edition of Eirodziesma, the music competition that selects Latvia's entries for the Eurovision Song Contest. The competition commenced on 4 February 2006 and concluded with a final on 11 March 2006. All shows in the competition were hosted by Uģis Joksts and Kristīne Pekule and broadcast on LTV1.

Format 
The format of the competition consisted of three shows: two semi-finals and a final. The two semi-finals, held on 4 and 11 February 2006, each featured ten competing entries from which five advanced to the final from each show. The final, held on 11 March 2006, selected the Latvian entry for Athens from the remaining ten entries over two rounds of voting: the first round selected the top three songs and the second round (superfinal) selected the winner. Results during the semi-final shows were determined by a jury panel and votes from the public. The songs first faced a public vote where the top three entries qualified. The jury then selected an additional two qualifiers from the remaining entries to proceed in the competition. In the final, a public vote exclusively determined which entry would be the winner. Viewers were able to vote via telephone or SMS.

Competing entries 
Artists and songwriters were able to submit their entries to the broadcaster between 20 September 2005 and 22 November 2005. A record 93 entries were submitted at the conclusion of the submission period. A jury panel appointed by LTV evaluated the submitted songs and selected twenty entries for the competition. The jury panel consisted of Ruslana (Ukrainian Eurovision Song Contest 2004 winner), Arsen Shagiev (Russian manager of 2001 Russian Eurovision entrant Mumiy Troll), Igor Volk (Russian producer), Manolo Dias (President of EMI Spain), Ramūnas Zilnys (Lithuanian music journalist), Walters and Kazha (2005 Latvian Eurovision entrant), Toms Grēviņš (radio DJ), Uldis Rudaks (music critic) and Daiga Mazvērsīte (musicologist). The twenty competing artists and songs were announced during a press conference on 6 December 2005. On 20 January 2006, LTV announced that the song "Day or Night" would be performed together with Amberlife by Anna Polanski instead of Jenny May after she was selected with more than one song.

Shows

Semi-finals 
The two semi-finals took place on 4 and 11 February 2006. The live portion of the show was held at the LTV studios in Riga where the artists awaited the results while their performances, which were filmed earlier on 26 and 28 January 2006, were screened. In each semi-final ten acts competed and five entries qualified to the final. The competing entries first faced a public vote where the top three songs advanced; an additional two qualifiers were then selected from the remaining seven entries by the jury. The jury panel that voted in the semi-finals consisted of Marija Naumova (Latvian Eurovision Song Contest 2002 winner), Egons Reiters (DJ at Radio SWH and director of LTV), Aigars Dinsbergs (producer), Edgars Kots (Deputy General Director of LTV) and Raimonds Pauls (composer).

Final 
The final took place at the Olympic Center in Ventspils on 11 March 2006. The ten entries that qualified from the preceding two semi-finals competed and the winner was selected over two rounds of public televoting. In the first round, the top three songs advanced to the second round, the superfinal. In the superfinal, "I Hear Your Heart" performed by Cosmos was declared the winner. In addition to the performances of the competing entries, guest performers included the group Putnu balle, 2004 Latvian Eurovision entrant Ivo Fomins with the group Borowa MC, 2005 Latvian Eurovision entrant Walters and Kazha, 2006 Estonian Eurovision entrant Sandra Oxenryd, 2006 Irish Eurovision entrant Brian Kennedy and 2006 Maltese Eurovision entrant Fabrizio Faniello.

Ratings

At Eurovision 
According to Eurovision rules, all nations with the exceptions of the host country, the "Big Four" (France, Germany, Spain and the United Kingdom) and the ten highest placed finishers in the 2005 contest are required to qualify from the semi-final in order to compete for the final; the top ten countries from the semi-final progress to the final. As one of the ten highest placed finishers in the 2006 contest, Latvia automatically qualified to compete in the final on 20 May 2006. In addition to their participation in the final, Latvia is also required to broadcast and vote in the semi-final on 18 May 2006. On 21 March 2006, a special allocation draw was held which determined the running order and Latvia was set to perform in position 4 during the final, following the entry from Israel and before the entry from Norway. Latvia placed sixteenth in the final, scoring 30 points.

The semi-final and the final were broadcast in Latvia on LTV1 with all shows featuring commentary by Kārlis Streips. The Latvian spokesperson, who announced the Latvian votes during the final, was Mārtiņš Freimanis.

Voting 
Below is a breakdown of points awarded to Latvia and awarded by Latvia in the semi-final and grand final of the contest. The nation awarded its 12 points to Russia in the semi-final and the final of the contest.

Points awarded to Latvia

Points awarded by Latvia

References

2006
Countries in the Eurovision Song Contest 2006
Eurovision